Alan Fletcher (born 1956) is president and CEO of the Aspen Music Festival and School and a music administrator and composer. He came to Aspen in March 2006 from the positions of Head of the School of Music and Professor of Music at Carnegie Mellon University in Pittsburgh, Pennsylvania, where he had been since 2001, and before that from leadership and faculty positions including provost and senior vice president at the New England Conservatory, where he was engaged for 16 years. He holds doctorate and master's degrees from The Juilliard School and a bachelor's degree from Princeton University, and has studied with distinguished composers such as Roger Sessions, Milton Babbitt, Edward T. Cone, and Paul Lansky.

He has won numerous composing awards and commissions, including recent commissions for the Pittsburgh Symphony and the National Gallery of Art. He lectures nationally and internationally on music and music administration, has a blog for Gramophone, and has written Op/Ed pieces for newspapers such as the Wall Street Journal, Pittsburgh Post-Gazette, Symphony, and Baltimore Sun. In addition, he sat on some of the field’s most prestigious committees such as The Gilmore Prize Artistic Board and Jury, on which he served with former AMFS artistic administrator Ara Guzelimian.

He lives in Aspen, Colorado with his partner Ronald Schiller.

External links 
     Aspen Music Festival and School.com website
      Look for Alan Fletcher on the Instant Encore.com website

References

Living people
American male classical composers
American classical composers
1956 births
Pupils of Roger Sessions
Aspen Music Festival and School faculty
Carnegie Mellon University faculty
New England Conservatory faculty
Juilliard School alumni
Princeton University alumni
Pupils of Milton Babbitt
Pupils of Edward T. Cone
Pupils of Paul Lansky
LGBT classical composers
American LGBT musicians
20th-century classical composers
21st-century classical composers
21st-century American composers
20th-century American composers